Kurt Hansen is a speedway rider. He was in 1984 Individual Speedway Junior European Championship, 1985 Individual Speedway Junior European Championship and 1993 Individual Speedway World Championship.

References

Year of birth missing (living people)
Living people
Danish speedway riders
Place of birth missing (living people)